Agotime-Ziope District is one of the eighteen districts in Volta Region, Ghana. Originally it was formerly part of the then-larger Adaklu-Anyigbe District on 13 August 2004, until the western part of the district was split off to create Adaklu District on 28 June 2012; thus the remaining part has been renamed as Agotime-Ziope District (under the then-president John Atta Mills government).  The district assembly is located in the central part of Volta Region and has Agortime-Kpetoe as its capital town.

References

Districts of Volta Region

States and territories established in 2012